Persoonia sericea, commonly known as the silky geebung, is a plant in the family Proteaceae and is endemic to eastern Australia. It is a shrub with hairy yellow flowers and silky-hairy young branches and leaves.

Description
Persoonia sericea is an erect to spreading shrub with its leaves and young branches covered with soft, silky hairs. The central style is surrounded by four yellow anthers which are also joined at the base with the tips rolled back, so that it resembles a cross when viewed end-on. The ovary is densely hairy.

Taxonomy and naming
Persoonia sericea was first formally described in 1830 by Robert Brown from an unpublished description by Allan Cunningham. The type specimen was collected near the Lachlan River by Cunningham and the description was published in Supplementum primum Prodromi florae Novae Hollandiae. The specific epithet (sericea) is a Latin word meaning "silky".

Distribution and habitat
Silky geebung grows in woodland and forest north from Grenfell in New South Wales and in south-eastern Queensland.

Ecology
Clumps of young seedlings of P. sericea have been observed emerging from decaying kangaroo dung near Brisbane.

References

sericea
Flora of New South Wales
Flora of Queensland
Proteales of Australia
Taxa named by Robert Brown (botanist, born 1773)
Plants described in 1830